Pedro Arispe (30 September 1900 – 4 May 1960), nicknamed El Indio, was a Uruguayan footballer. He won a gold medal in the football tournaments at the 1924 Summer Olympics and the 1928 Summer Olympics.

He played in more than 300 matches in the Uruguayan First Division over the course of 17 seasons (1919–1937) for Rampla Juniors, winning the title in 1927 and a runner's-up spot in 1932. He also played for amateur teams Belgrano Oriental, Reformers and Albion del Cerro.

He was an assistant coach to Alberto Suppici during the 1930 FIFA World Cup.

References

External links

1900 births
1960 deaths
Uruguayan people of Basque descent
Uruguayan footballers
Olympic footballers of Uruguay
Footballers at the 1924 Summer Olympics
Footballers at the 1928 Summer Olympics
Olympic gold medalists for Uruguay
Uruguay international footballers
Uruguayan Primera División players
Rampla Juniors players
Olympic medalists in football
Copa América-winning players
Medalists at the 1928 Summer Olympics
Medalists at the 1924 Summer Olympics
Association football defenders